The 1896 Wimbledon Championships took place on the outdoor grass courts at the All England Lawn Tennis Club in Wimbledon, London, United Kingdom. The tournament ran from 13 July until 21 July. It was the 20th staging of the Wimbledon Championships, and the first Grand Slam tennis event of 1896. The number of entries for the men's singles competition was 31, the highest since 1881. Harold Mahony and Charlotte Cooper won the singles titles. The All England Plate was introduced for players who had lost in the first or second round of the singles.

Champions

Men's singles

 Harold Mahony defeated  Wilfred Baddeley, 6–2, 6–8, 5–7, 8–6, 6–3

Women's singles

 Charlotte Cooper defeated  Alice Simpson Pickering, 6–2, 6–3

Men's doubles

 Herbert Baddeley /  Wilfred Baddeley defeated  Reginald Doherty /  Harold Nisbet, 1–6, 3–6, 6–4, 6–2, 6–1

References

External links
 Official Wimbledon Championships website

 
Wimbledon Championships
Wimbledon Championships
Wimbledon Championships
Wimbledon Championships